The 1941–42 Southern Football League was the second edition of the regional war-time football league tournament.

Table

Results

References
Scottish Football History – Southern Football league

season
1
Scot